Thor Helland (10 December 1936 – 2 August 2021) was a Norwegian long-distance runner who specialized in the 5000 metres.

Helland was born in Sørfold, Nordland.

At the 1964 Summer Olympics he finished eighth in the 5000m final in 13:57.0 minutes. He became Norwegian champion 12 times in the years 1961 to 1967. He represented the club IL i BUL.

His personal best time was 13:37.4 minutes, achieved in June 1965 in Helsinki. He held the Norwegian record for 3000m three times, 5000m two times, and 10,000m once. He also held the Nordic record for 5000m and 3000m in 1965.

He and his wife, Unni Helland (a prominent athlete herself) have contributed a great deal to their club IL i BUL as coaches. In 2020 they were still actively training and supporting the new generation of athletes.

Thor and Unni Helland lived in Oslo, Norway and have two children together, Ståle (b.1961) and Lasse (b.1963). They also have two granddaughters: Anine (b.1992) and Emilie Josephine (b.1993).

References

External links
sports-reference

1936 births
2021 deaths
People from Sørfold
Norwegian male long-distance runners
Athletes (track and field) at the 1964 Summer Olympics
Olympic athletes of Norway
Norwegian athletics coaches
Sportspeople from Nordland